Aurat Teri Yehi Kahani is a 1988 Indian Hindi-language film directed by Mohanji Prasad. It stars Raj Babbar and Meenakshi Seshadri.

Plot

Shortly after giving birth to Savitri, her mom passes away, leaving her disabled dad, Dharamraj, no alternative save to remarry Champa, who gives birth to a son, Ketan. Champa is very cruel to Savitri and severely slaps and beats her around. Years later, the children have grown up, and Dharamraj has taken to alcohol in a big way. Then Ketan gets a job in the city and moves out. Shortly thereafter they receive a letter from him that he has got a job, but needs a security deposit of a thousand Rupees. Savitri agrees to marry an aging rich widower, Thakur, in return for the thousand Rupees, if she does not return the money by Diwali. Savitri, who loves Satyavan, is forced to marry Thakur, but on the night of the marriage, the Thakur dies because of a snake-bite. Widowed Savitri is molested by his younger brother, Balwant, and tries to kill herself. She is saved by a few villagers, but then subsequently sold to a Madam, Jamnunabai, who wants her to work as a Courtesan for the rest of her life. Her patrons are happy and a rich man, Nawab Hasmat Ali Baig, is willing to pay a huge sum of money for sexual favors. The question is what will Savitri do under these circumstances?

Cast
 Raj Babbar ... Satyavan Sathu"
 Meenakshi Seshadri ... Savitri
 Nirupa Roy ... Thakurain
 Pran ... Ghotala
 Kader Khan ... Ghadbad
 Raj Kiran ... Balwant
 Shoma Anand ... Balwant's wife
 Aruna Irani ... Champa
 Dinesh Hingoo as Bisre.
 Mohan Choti as Bhule
 Shreeram Lagoo as Dharamraj
 Nilu Phule as Thakur sahab
 Shashi Puri as Ketan
 Ashok Saraf as Bhagwan Singh

Soundtrack

External links

1980s Hindi-language films
1988 films
Films scored by Anand–Milind